In association footballing terms, a caretaker manager or interim manager is somebody who takes temporary charge of the management of a football team, usually when the regular manager is dismissed or leaves for a different club. However, a caretaker manager may also be appointed if the regular manager is suspended, ill, has suspected COVID-19 or is unable to attend to their usual duties. Examples of caretaker managers are Jordi Roura, Angelo Alessio, Germán Burgos and Rob Page. Caretaker managers are normally appointed at short notice from within the club, usually the assistant manager, a senior coach, or an experienced player.

Caretaker managers in Eastern Europe
Caretaker managers in Eastern Europe are head coaches that carry prefix title performing duties or sometimes temporary performing duties. These managers do not have a required license (UEFA Pro Licence) to be full pledged head coaches (managers).

Normally, caretaker manager duties performed by an assistant head coach, sometimes titled as a senior coach, once approved by the club. In case if whole head coaching office was dismissed, a caretaker or a caretaker manager would be appointed from outside of the club. The outside caretaker also may be appointed also instead of already employed a head coach assistant or a senior coach.

Caretaker managers in practice
Famous examples include long-standing Arsenal assistant manager Stewart Houston, who stepped in after George Graham was abruptly sacked in the middle of the 1994–95 season and guided the club to the 1995 European Cup Winners' Cup Final. Tony Barton was appointed manager of Aston Villa after the departure of Ron Saunders and led the club to win the 1982 European Cup Final after only three months in charge. Club Director Trevor Brooking was appointed a caretaker manager of West Ham United following Glenn Roeder's illness at the end of the 2002–03 season, then again following his dismissal early in the 2003–04 season.

Permanent appointments
If a caretaker manager proves to be particularly successful during their spell in charge, they are sometimes given the manager's job permanently. Glenn Roeder was appointed permanent manager of Newcastle United after having taken over as caretaker manager following Graeme Souness's dismissal in 2006. This also occurred when Ricky Sbragia was given the Sunderland job permanently after Roy Keane's resignation in November 2008 but he also resigned at the end of the season 2008–09. This also happened in the 2010–11 Premier League; on 8 January 2011, Roy Hodgson was sacked by Liverpool after a run of poor results, and with Liverpool languishing in 12th place, Kenny Dalglish was appointed the caretaker manager of Liverpool for the remainder of the season. After an impressive run of results, which saw Liverpool rise to sixth in the table, Dalglish was appointed the permanent manager of Liverpool, on a three-year contract. In the 2018–19 Premier League; on 18 December 2018, José Mourinho was sacked by Manchester United after losing 3–1 against Liverpool, and with Manchester United in sixth place, former player Ole Gunnar Solskjær was appointed the caretaker manager of Manchester United for the rest of the season. After an impressive run of results, which saw Manchester United rise to fourth in the table and qualified for UEFA Champions League quarter-finals, Solskjær was appointed as permanent manager of Manchester United on 28 March 2019, on a three-year contract.

In Norway, a notable example occurred in 2006 when Rosenborg BK coach Per-Mathias Høgmo announced he was taking a leave of absence in mid-season, citing health concerns. At the time, Rosenborg were ten points behind leaders SK Brann. His assistant Knut Tørum was appointed on a caretaker basis, and proceeded to lead Rosenborg to a furious comeback, clinching the league title with one match to spare. Høgmo announced his resignation two days after Rosenborg clinched, and Tørum was named permanent coach after the season.

In Ireland, Charlie McGeever was twice appointed caretaker manager of Finn Harps in separate decades (1984–85 and 1995–96) before being given the job on a permanent basis; as permanent manager he led the club to the 1999 FAI Cup Final, which they narrowly lost to an injury time penalty rebound after a three-match marathon.

In Italy, After Juventus fired Claudio Ranieri following a string of seven league games without a win in the 2008–09 season, Ciro Ferrara was named caretaker head coach of Juventus on 18 May 2009 for the remaining two weeks of the season, with the goal of maintaining second place in the league table, and the possibility of being appointed on a full-time basis for a longer period. In his two games as caretaker coach, he led Juventus to 3–0 and 2–0 wins over Siena and Lazio respectively, thus ensuring a second-place finish over rivals Milan. Following these results, he emerged as a strong candidate for to take the job permanently for the next season. On 5 June 2009, Juventus formally announced his appointment as head coach for 2009–10 season. After winning his first four league matches, Ferrara's fortunes changed after Juve failed to make the knockout stage of the 2009–10 UEFA Champions League following a 4–1 defeat by Bayern Munich at home in a match where a draw would have awarded Juve the qualification to the following phase, despite a promising start to the campaign. Despite a win over Derby d'Italia rivals Internazionale, Juve embarked on a losing streak over the winter, notably against minor teams such as Sicilian side Catania and recently promoted Bari.  Six days later, Juventus were knocked out of the Coppa Italia by Inter 2–1 at the San Siro, leading the board of directors to ultimately sack Ferrara after weeks of speculation regarding his position, replacing him with Alberto Zaccheroni until the end of the season. In 2011–12 season, Inter sacked Claudio Ranieri as head coach and Andrea Stramaccioni was promoted to the first team as caretaker coach, He led Inter to sixth place and a success in the Derby della Madonnina against Milan that cost Inter's crosstown rivals the Serie A title; his results led club owner Massimo Moratti to confirm him as head coach for the 2012–13 season, as well. The FIGC allowed Stramaccioni to sign the contract without a UEFA Pro Licence as he was admitted to 2012–13 coaching course in order to obtain the licence in June 2013. On 7 October 2012, Stramaccioni guided Inter to a 1–0 victory over Milan, On 3 November 2012, Stramaccioni guided Inter to a 3–1 away victory over the previous season's champions, Juventus. After 14 months in charge of Inter and a difficult 2012–13 Serie A campaign which saw them finish in 9th place and thus fail to qualify for Europe for the first time in 15 seasons, the club announced on 24 May 2013 that Stramaccioni had been sacked and replaced by Walter Mazzarri.

In Spain, On 30 October 2018, Julen Lopetegui was sacked as Real Madrid coach after poor results, with the appointment of Santiago Solari as caretaker coach. After 14 days, Solari was given a permanent contract because in Spain no club was allowed to have a caretaker manager for more than two weeks. Later he was sacked and replaced by former teammate Zinedine Zidane for the second time.

In Germany, On 3 November 2019, Niko Kovač left Bayern Munich by mutual consent after a 5–1 loss to Eintracht Frankfurt, his assistant Hansi Flick, promoted as interim coach. In his first match in charge, Bayern defeated Olympiakos 2–0 in the UEFA Champions League group stage on 6 November 2019, In April 2020, Bayern Munich appointed Flick as permanent coach with a contract until 2023. Flick successfully guided Bayern to win the Bundesliga, DFB-Pokal and UEFA Champions League, thus completing the continental treble for the second time in the club's history, the following season, he led Bayern to win the 2020 UEFA Super Cup against Sevilla. He also led Bayern to win its first ever sextuple after winning Club World Cup in February 2021 by defeating Mexican team Tigres.

Rob Page temporarily appointed as caretaker manager of Wales national team after Ryan Giggs was arrested in 2020. later he named as Wales permanent manager in 2022.

On the other hand, Tony Parkes was appointed as caretaker manager of Blackburn Rovers on six separate occasions between 1986 and 2004, without ever being given the role in a permanent capacity. He is still yet to be given a permanent managerial role, also Voro was appointed as caretaker coach of Valencia on six separate occasions but he was appointed as permanent head coach in 2016 until end of the season, Vicente del Bosque also appointed as Real Madrid caretaker coach twice in 1994 and 1996.

Notable success
In November 2007, Sandy Stewart led St Johnstone to victory in the final of the Scottish Challenge Cup in his only game in charge as caretaker manager.

In the 2007–08 season, Cevat Güler won Süper Lig as Galatasaray's caretaker manager. He was in charge for the last five matches of the season due to Karl Heinz Feldkamp's resignation.

In the 2007 Hazfi Cup Final, Sepahan's head coach, Luka Bonačić had travelled to his country, Croatia for personal reasons and was unavailable to manage the team in the second leg. Mansour Ebrahimzadeh who was assistant to Bonačić served as caretaker manager for that match. Sepahan won the match and the title.

Guus Hiddink was caretaker manager of Chelsea in 2009, leading his team to the UEFA Champions League semi-final, where they shut out FC Barcelona at Camp Nou and tied them back at Stamford Bridge. The latter was later said as a very controversial game, particularly in decisions made by the referee Tom Henning Øvrebø. Chelsea would be later eliminated on away goals. He finished off his tenure with the team as they won the FA Cup. The club was reported happy to have Hiddink as manager even on a temporary basis.

Roberto Di Matteo won the Champions League and FA Cup as caretaker manager of Chelsea in 2012, leading to him being appointed permanent manager on a two-year contract. He was sacked a few months into the new season, being replaced by interim manager, Rafael Benítez, who led his team to victory in the Europa League, as well as guiding the team to a third-place finish in the league, thus ensuring direct qualification for next year's Champions League. Benítez was not offered a contract as permanent manager, instead being replaced by José Mourinho who went back to Chelsea for a second term.

In the 2020–21 season, Edin Terzić won DFB-Pokal as Borussia Dortmund's caretaker manager. later he was appointed as permanent manager of Borussia Dortmund in 2022–23 season.

See also
Head coach

References

Association football terminology
Association football occupations